Tamar may refer to:

Arts, entertainment and media
 Tamar (album), by Tamar Braxton, 2000
 Tamar (novel), by Mal Peet, 2005
 Tamar (poem), an epic poem by Robinson Jeffers

People
 Tamar (name), including a list of people with the name

 Tamar (Genesis), mother of Perez and Zerah, the twin sons of the biblical Judah
 Tamar (daughter of David), daughter of biblical king David
 Tamar (goddess), deity in Georgian mythology
 Tamar of Georgia (1160s–1213), ruled 1184–1213
 Tamar, also known as Gürcü Hatun (fl. 1237–1286), Georgian princess
 Támar (born 1980), American singer

Places
 Tamar, Hong Kong
Tamar station
 Tamar, Mazandaran, Iran
 Tamar, West Azerbaijan, Iran
 Tamar, Yazd, Iran
 Tamar block, Ranchi district, Jharkhand, India
 Tamar, India, Ranchi district, Jharkhand
Tamar (Vidhan Sabha constituency)
 Tamar gas field, off the coast of Israel
 Tamar Regional Council, a local government in Israel
 Tamar River, in northern Tasmania, Australia
Electoral division of Tamar
 River Tamar, in south west England
 Tamar (valley), the continuation of the Planica valley in the Julian Alps, Slovenia

Transportation and military
 Tamar-class lifeboat, a British lifeboat class
 HMS Tamar, the name of several ships and a naval station
 RM Tamar, a Royal Marines facility in Plymouth, England
 Tamar, and Tamar II, former and current Torpoint Ferry vessels
 Tamar, a GWR Caliph Class locomotive

Other uses
 Projeto TAMAR, a Brazilian non-profit organization
 Tamar FC, a former Australian football club

See also

Tamara (disambiguation)
Tamir (disambiguation)